The Securus was a German automobile manufactured only in 1906.  A two-speed tricar, it was built in Berlin by Max Ortmann.

References
David Burgess Wise, The New Illustrated Encyclopedia of Automobiles.

Three-wheeled motor vehicles